Kemille King (born January 2, 1977) is an American professional racing cyclist, who currently rides for UCI Women's Continental Team .

See also
 List of 2016 UCI Women's Teams and riders

References

External links
 

1977 births
Living people
American female cyclists
People from Kaysville, Utah
Cyclists from Utah
21st-century American women